The 2012 Trophée des Alpilles was a professional tennis tournament played on hard courts. It was the fourth edition of the tournament which was part of the 2012 ATP Challenger Tour. It took place in Saint-Rémy-de-Provence, France between 3 and 9 September 2012.

Singles main-draw entrants

Seeds

 1 Rankings are as of August 27, 2012.

Other entrants
The following players received wildcards into the singles main draw:
  Antoine Escoffier
  Adrian Mannarino
  Elie Rousset
  Martin Vaisse

The following players received entry from the qualifying draw:
  Guillermo Olaso
  Sami Reinwein
  Florian Reynet
  David Rice

Champions

Singles

 Josselin Ouanna def.  Flavio Cipolla, 6–4, 7–5

Doubles

 Laurynas Grigelis /  Uladzimir Ignatik def.  Jordi Marsé-Vidri /  Carles Poch Gradin, 6–7(4–7), 6–3, [10–6]

External links
Official website

Trophee des Alpilles
Trophée des Alpilles
2012 in French tennis